Uchermann is a surname. Notable people with the surname include:

Karl Uchermann (1855–1940), Norwegian painter and illustrator
Vilhelm Uchermann (1852–1929), Norwegian physician

Norwegian-language surnames